The Lasker Awards have been awarded annually since 1945 to living persons who have made major contributions to medical science or who have performed public service on behalf of medicine. They are administered by the Lasker Foundation, which was founded by Albert Lasker and his wife Mary Woodard Lasker (later a medical research activist). The awards are sometimes referred to as "America's Nobels".

The Lasker Awards have gained a reputation for identifying future winners of the Nobel Prize. Eighty-six Lasker laureates have received the Nobel Prize, including 32 in the last two decades. Claire Pomeroy is the current president of the Lasker Foundation.

Award
The award is given in four branches of medical science:

 Albert Lasker Basic Medical Research Award
 Lasker-DeBakey Clinical Medical Research Award
 Lasker-Bloomberg Public Service Award (Renamed in 2011 from Mary Woodard Lasker Public Service Award. Renamed in 2000 from Albert Lasker Public Service Award.)
 Lasker-Koshland Special Achievement Award in Medical Science (1994–)(optional)
The awards carry an honorarium of $250,000 for each category.

A collection of papers from the Albert and Mary Lasker Foundation were donated to the National Library of Medicine by Mrs. Albert D. Lasker in April 1985.

In addition to the main awards, there are historical awards that are no longer awarded.

Recent awards
Recent winners include the following:

Historical awards
Awards no longer made include Special Public Health Awards, Special Awards, Group Awards, and Lasker Awards made by the International Society for the Rehabilitation of the Disabled, the National Committee Against Mental Illness, and Planned Parenthood - World Population. Awards were also presented for medical journalism.

Special Public Health awards
1975 – Merck Sharp and Dohme Research Laboratories:  Jr., James M. Sprague, John E. Baer, Frederick C. Novello
1980 – National Heart, Lung, and Blood Institute
1984 – Dorothy T. Krieger, Kevin McLaughlin Jr.
1987 – Centennial Salute to the National Institutes of Health

Special awards
1947 – Thomas Parran Jr.
1949 – Haven Emerson
1952 – Charles-Edward Amory Winslow
1956 – Alan Gregg
1959 – J. Lister Hill and John E. Fogarty

Group awards
1946 – National Institutes of Health; National Regional Research Laboratory of the US Department of Agriculture; Board for the Coordination of Malarial Studies; Bureau of Entomology and Plant Quarantine of the US Department of Agriculture; Army Epidemiological Board
1947 – British Ministry of Health and Ministry of Food; United States Committee on Joint Causes of Death
1948 – Veterans Administration's Department of Medicine and Surgery
1949 – American Academy of Pediatrics; Life Insurance Medical Research Fund
1950 – International Health Division of The Rockefeller Foundation
1951 – Health Insurance Plan of Greater New York; Alcoholics Anonymous
1953 – Division of Research Grants of the National Institutes of Health; University Laboratory of Physical Chemistry Related to Medicine at Harvard University
1954 – Streptococcal Disease Laboratory, Armed Forces Epidemiological Board, Francis E. Warren Air Force Base: Charles H. Rammelkamp Jr., Director
1956 – Food and Drug Administration; Medical Care Program, Welfare and Retirement Fund of the United Mine Workers of America
1960 – Crippled Children's Program of the Children's Bureau; Chronic Disease Program of the California State Department of Public Health (Lester Breslow)

International Society for the Rehabilitation of the Disabled
1954 – Henry H. Kessler, Juan Farill, Viscount Nuffield
1957 – Howard A. Rusk, Fabian W. G. Langenskiold, World Veterans Federation
1960 – Mary E. Switzer, Gudmund Harlem, Paul W. Brand
1963 – Renato de Costa Bomfim, Kurt Jansson, Leonard W. Mayo
1966 – Poul Stochholm, Wiktor Dega, Eugene J. Taylor
1969 – Gustav Gringas, Mr and Mrs Raden Soeharso, Andre Trannoy, International Labour Organization
1972 – James F. Garrett, Kamala V. Nimbkar, Jean Regniers

National Committee Against Mental Illness
1944 – William C. Menninger
1945 – G. Brock Chisholm, John Rawlings Rees
1946 – W. Horsley Gantt, Jules H. Masserman, Walter Lerch, Douglass Rice Sharpe, Lawrence K. Frank
1947 – Catherine MacKenzie
1948 – C. Anderson Aldrich, Mike Gorman, Al Ostrow
1949 – Mildred C. Scoville, Albert Deutsch

Planned Parenthood - World Population
1945 – John McLeod, Felix J. Underwood
1946 – Robert Latou Dickinson, Irl Cephas Riggin
1947 – Alan F. Guttmacher, Abraham Stone
1948 – John Rock, Richard N. Pierson
1949 – George M. Cooper, Carl G. Hartman
1950 – Margaret Sanger, Bessie L. Moses
1951 – Guy Irving Burch, William Vogt
1952 – John William Roy Norton, Herbert Thoms, Eleanor Bellows Pillsbury
1953 – Harry Emerson Fosdick, Elise Ottesen-Jensen
1954 – Dhanvanthi Rama Rau, M. C. Chang,  Howard C. Taylor
1955 – Warren O. Nelson, Robert Carter Cook
1958 – Harrison S. Brown
1959 – Julian Huxley
1960 – Gregory Pincus
1961 – John D. Rockefeller, III
1964 – Cass Canfield
1965 – C. Lee Buxton, Estelle T. Griswold

See also

 List of medicine awards

References

External links
The Lasker Foundation - Official site
 Albert and Mary Lasker Foundation - Albert Lasker Awards Archives (1944-)—National Library of Medicine finding aid

 
Medicine awards
Awards established in 1945
1945 establishments in the United States